Brian Bonar (born July 19, 1947) is an American businessman. He is known as the chairman and CEO of Dalrada Financial Corporation and American Management Services. In addition, he is the author of United States of Success Innovate, Re-Invent And Focus.

Bonar is the chairman and CEO of The Amanda Co., Inc.; chairman of Trucept, Inc. president, and CEO of Smart-tek Automated Services, a subsidiary of Trucept; and co-president at Allegiant Professional Business Services, Inc.

Early life and education
Bonar was born on July 19, 1947, in Greenock, Scotland, United Kingdom. In 1969, he received a bachelor’s degree in mechanical engineering from the City and Guilds of London Institute. He then completed his master’s in mechanical engineering from the Stafford University in 1985.

Career
Bonar began his career in April 1969 at IBM. There, he worked as a procurement manager and was responsible for outsourcing motherboards for several IBM PCs. He worked there till March 1985 and joined QMS as director of engineering.

Then in 1989, Bonar became the vice president of sales and marketing at Rastek Corporation, where he managed worldwide sales of printing technology. In addition, he also founded a company named Beizer Systems in 1994.

In his professional life, Bonar has worked in the department of sales and marketing for other companies, including Allegiant Professional Business Services and ITEC Imaging Technologies. He maintained and developed relationships with all Japanese and Korean printer manufacturers. In 2003, became the chairman and CEO of the Solvis Group, which provides staffing, PEO, and ASO services to medical and call center market segments.

In 1995, Bonar began working as the director of Dalrada Financial and then became the board chairman in December 1999. In the same year, he became the CEO of the company. As of 2022, he is chairman, president, and CEO at Dalrada Financial Corp., chairman at Dalrada Precision Corp., and CEO at Dalrada Health Products, a subsidiary of Dalrada Financial Corp.

As of 2022, he is the chairman and CEO of The Amanda Co., Inc., chairman for Trucept, Inc., president and CEO of Smart-tek Automated Services, a subsidiary of Trucept, and co-president at Allegiant Professional Business Services, Inc.

Publications
On February 8, 2022, Bonar published his first book titled United States of Success Innovate, Re-Invent And Focus.

Bonar, Brian (February 8, 2022). United States of Success Innovate, Re-Invent And Focus. ISBN 979-8414495574
Bonar, Brian. Survival Of The Fighter.

References

External links

Living people
1947 births
American business executives
People from Greenock
People from San Diego